Cedar Cove (1884), also known as Villa LeMoyne or the Joseph D. Peet Estate, is a "summer cottage" on the eastern shore of Cazenovia Lake in Cazenovia, Madison County, New York. It was listed on the National Register of Historic Places in 1991.

The listing includes 4 contributing buildings, 2 non-contributing buildings over a  area. Also on the property is a Tudor-style boathouse.

Cedar Cove is "architecturally and historically important as an outstanding early example of the type of large mansions constructed chiefly as summer residences by wealthy clients in the late nineteenth and early twentieth centuries near the shores of Cazenovia Lake in central New York."

Designed by architect George Browne Post, it set a high standard.  Other "summer cottages" following included
Ormonde, designed by architect Frank Furness; Notleymere, designed by architect Robert W. Gibson; Scrooby, designed by architect Robert S. Stephenson; and Shore Acres, designed by architect Stanford White.

It is part of the Cazenovia Town Multiple Resource area.

References

Houses on the National Register of Historic Places in New York (state)
Queen Anne architecture in New York (state)
Houses completed in 1884
Shingle Style houses
Houses in Madison County, New York
Historic districts on the National Register of Historic Places in New York (state)
National Register of Historic Places in Cazenovia, New York
Shingle Style architecture in New York (state)